Kathleen Barber is an American writer and non-practicing lawyer. Television rights to her 2017 debut novel Are You Sleeping were sold to Hello Sunshine, and a series called "Truth Be Told", based on the book, was produced for Apple TV+ and debuted in December 2019.

Barber was raised in Galesburg, Illinois. She earned a Bachelor's degree at University of Illinois, where she was initiated into Alpha Gamma Delta, and her J.D. at the Northwestern University School of Law. She worked for a number of years as an attorney in firms in Chicago and New York, where she focused her practice on bankruptcy law.

Barber describes how she had been writing, as a hobby, for years, but the decision she and her husband made to quit their jobs, and travel around the world, triggered her completion of Are You Sleeping. Barber said that she was inspired by the Serial podcast. Her novel focuses around a podcast host, whose investigations turns up evidence of a wrongful conviction.

The Galesburg Register-Mail reported Barber's upcoming followup novel, Follow Me, will also be a mystery, revolving around social media. It is scheduled to be published on February 25, 2020.

References

American lawyers
21st-century American novelists
Living people
Year of birth missing (living people)
Novelists from Illinois
People from Galesburg, Illinois
University of Illinois alumni
Northwestern University Pritzker School of Law alumni
Place of birth missing (living people)